Wendy Joanne Myrvold is a Canadian mathematician and computer scientist known for her work on graph algorithms, planarity testing, and algorithms in enumerative combinatorics. She is a professor emeritus of computer science at the University of Victoria.

Myrvold completed her Ph.D. in 1988 at the University of Waterloo. Her dissertation, The Ally and Adversary Reconstruction Problems, was supervised by Charles Colbourn.

References

External links
Home page

Canadian women mathematicians
Canadian women computer scientists
Canadian computer scientists
Graph theorists
University of Waterloo alumni
Academic staff of the University of Victoria
Year of birth missing (living people)
Living people